Mary Lou Metzger (born November 13, 1950) is an American singer and dancer best known as a cast member on The Lawrence Welk Show.

Metzger was born in Pittsburgh, Pennsylvania, the only child of Ernie and Helen Metzger. The family moved to Havertown, Pennsylvania, where at the age of seven Metzger officially began her performing career, which included appearances on The Ted Mack Amateur Hour and acting in a national tour of The Music Man. While a student at Temple University, she went to Los Angeles, California to appear on the television program GE College Bowl; while there she auditioned for Lawrence Welk and was accepted in the show's apprentice training program.

During her twelve years on the show, she sang as part of a female trio with fellow Welk stars Gail Farrell and Sandi Griffiths, various group numbers, and song-and-dance numbers with Jack Imel; she also danced with the maestro himself at the end of each show. After the show ended its regular run on television, she continued to pursue acting, which included commercials, and parts on both the small and the big screen, such as Garry Marshall's 1999 film The Other Sister. She also co-founded the Actors' Conservatory Ensemble theater group in 1990.

Metzger continues to perform with Welk alumni on concert tours, and regularly appears on pledge drives for PBS, which now airs The Lawrence Welk Show on more than 250 stations. Through much of the late 2000s, she hosted the wraparounds of the show featuring interviews with members of the Musical Family, conducted by Metzger herself. (She has since been replaced by Bobby Burgess for most episodes, though episodes hosted by Metzger continue to air.)

Family
She is married to Richard Maloof, who played double bass and tuba on The Lawrence Welk Show. They live in Sherman Oaks, California.

References

External links
Profile, WelkShow.net; accessed March 3, 2016.
Profile, imdb.com; accessed March 3, 2016.

Musicians from Pittsburgh
1950 births
Living people
Lawrence Welk